Michael Rose (born 11 July 1957) is a Grammy award-winning reggae singer from Jamaica. He is known for a successful tenure with Black Uhuru from 1977 to 1984, and he has worked regularly with Dennis Brown, Big Youth, The Wailers, Gregory Isaacs, Sly and Robbie, and others. He has also released more than twenty solo albums.

Career
Rose started his recording career as a solo artist for record producers Yabby You and Niney the Observer. He joined Black Uhuru in 1977 after the departure of Don Carlos and Garth Dennis. As lead singer and a primary songwriter, Rose led Black Uhuru to international recognition in the early 1980s, and the group won the first-ever Grammy Award for reggae in 1985 for the album Anthem.

Rose left Black Uhuru in 1985 after falling out with group founder Duckie Simpson, and retired to the Blue Mountains in Jamaica to start a coffee farm. He released a string of singles in Jamaica, but nothing much was heard of him outside the island until 1989, when he was signed to RCA and released the strongly pop influenced album Proud in Europe and Japan. The deal with RCA was short-lived however, and Rose returned to Jamaica to record a new string of Sly and Robbie produced singles. He also recorded for other producers but the only albums during this period were the Japan only releases Bonanza (1991) and King Of General (1992). The Sly and Robbie produced singles were eventually released on the vinyl only Sly And Robbie presents: Mykall Rose – The Taxi Sessions in 1995 also saw his American debut as a solo artist with the album Michael Rose on Heartbeat Records. The single "Short Temper" reached No. 2 on the Gavin reggae chart.

In the period 1995–2004 Heartbeat Records released a total of nine albums including Party in Session: Live and a compilation entitled Happiness: The Best Of Michael Rose. Next to these albums, a great amount of different recordings appeared on dozens of Jamaican vinyl singles and several albums, including "Last Chance" which was No. 1 on the UK reggae charts for several weeks. He also recorded "Michael Rows the Boat Ashore" in 2001.

In 2002, Rose recorded two albums: Babylon 9/11 Tip Of The Iceberg (released on Love Injection in 2004), and a yet untitled album for African Star records. In August 2002, Rose was reported arrested in Miami Airport by U.S. Marshals in a case of mistaken identity. Although he was released, it resulted in Rose losing his U.S. work permit.

Rose re-joined Black Uhuru in February 2004, and performed several concerts in Jamaica and Europe with the group. They also released a Jamaican single "Dollars" and reportedly have recorded a yet untitled and unreleased album. Yet, in spite of his reunion with Black Uhuru, Rose still tours, records and releases material as a solo artist. In 2007 he recorded the number 1 single "Shoot Out" for producer John John. His latest album was released early 2008 on the Rhythm Club record label, entitled Great Expectations.

In August 2019 he released the album Ska Ska Ska, his first ska album, recorded with Venezuelan musician/producer Dario Amarado. Rose was also an inaugural member of the Independent Music Awards' judging panel to support independent artists.

Name spelling
From about 1991 onwards, his name was often spelled 'Mykal Rose', which Rose has said is the Ethiopian way of spelling his name, which made it feel closer to home. Other spellings found on certain releases include 'Mykal Roze', 'Mikal Rose', 'Michael Roze' and so forth. This may have caused difficulty in tracking down releases.

Discography

Singles
"Key of Keys" (Trojan Rockers TRO 9019) (1977)
"Short Temper" (6 song maxi-single) (1995)
"Rude Boys (Back in Town)" (6 song maxi-single) (1996)
"Are You Ready For Something New" (Rebel Cuts) (2006)
"Jump Nya Benge" (2006)
"Shoot Out" (2007)
"Light of Zion" (2018)
"Glory To Jah" (2022)
Duet with Shabba Ranks in 2000,on the Dancehall hit: "Shine-eyed Gal"

Albums 

Proud (1990)
Bonanza (Japan) (1992)
King Of General (1994)
Voice of the Ghetto (1995)
Michael Rose (1995)
Rising Star (1995)
Be Yourself (1996)
Big Sound Frontline (1996)
Nuh Carbon (1996)
Dance Wicked (1997)
Dub Wicked (1997)
Selassie I Showcase (1997)
Party in Session: Live (1998), Heartbeat
Bonanza (diff from Japan 1992 release) (1999)
X Uhuru (1999)
Never Give It Up (2001)
Live in San Francisco (2002), 2B1 – released in 2003 as Live at Maritime Hall
Fire Fire Burning (2002)
Happiness: The Best Of Michael Rose (2004)
Babylon 9/11 - Tip of the Iceberg (2004)
African Roots (2005)
African Dub (2005)
Babylon A Fight (2006)
Warrior (2007)
Passion Of Life (2007)
Warrior Dub (2007)
The Saga (2007)
Great Expectations (2008)
Dub Expectations (2008)
Reggae Legend (2012)
Showdown Inna Bloody Town (2012)
Ska Ska Ska (2019), InnerCat

References

External links
Mykal Rose Official Website
Mykal Rose Bio
Last.FM: Michael Rose Page
Mykal "Grammy" Rose Official Myspace page

1957 births
Living people
Musicians from Kingston, Jamaica
Jamaican reggae singers
Jamaican male singers
Black Uhuru members
Grammy Award winners
Heartbeat Records artists
Greensleeves Records artists